Garmdarreh Metro Station is a station in Tehran Metro Line 5. It is located north of Tehran-Karaj Freeway and near Garmdare Park. It is between Vardavard Metro Station and Atmosfer Metro Station. For a long time the station was not operational due to the pending construction of access-road. It began operation on 2/18/2017 .

References 

Tehran Metro stations